The 2006 Basildon District Council election took place on 4 May 2006 to elect members of Basildon District Council in Essex, England. One third of the council was up for election and the Conservative party stayed in overall control of the council.

After the election, the composition of the council was
Conservative 27
Labour 12
Liberal Democrats 3

Election result
The results saw the Conservative party increase their majority to 12 seats after gaining 3 seats from Labour. The Conservatives gains came in the wards of Laindon Park, Pitsea North West and Pitsea South East enabling the party to win 11 of the 14 seats contested. Overall turnout in the election was 33.5%.

Ward results

Billericay East

Billericay West

Burstead

Crouch

Fryerns

Laindon Park

Langdon Hills

Lee Chapel North

Nethermayne

Pitsea North West

Pitsea South East

Wickford Castledon

Wickford North

Wickford Park

References

2006
2006 English local elections
2000s in Essex